Kräuter is a German surname. 
Notable people with the surname include:

Aaron Krauter, American politician
Mónica Kräuter (born 1967), Venezuelan chemist
Neil C. Krauter, American businessman
Sebastian Kräuter (1922–2008), Romanian Roman Catholic bishop
Stefan Krauter (born 1963), German scientist

See also
Kreuter, Kreutter, Kreuder, Greuter

German-language surnames
de:Kräuter